Nahur (also Romanized as Nahūr) is a village in Bostan Rural District, Sangan District, Khaf County, Razavi Khorasan Province, Iran. At the 2006 census, its population was 197, in 48 families.

References 

Populated places in Khaf County